David Vance Tobik (born March 2, 1953) is an American former right-handed professional baseball relief pitcher. After attending Ohio University, Tobik played eight seasons in the Major League Baseball (MLB) with the Detroit Tigers (1978–1982), Texas Rangers (1983–1984), and Seattle Mariners (1985).

Career

Ohio University
Tobik played college baseball at Ohio University where he was an All-Mid-American Conference pitcher from 1971 to 1974. During the 1974 season, Tobik compiled a record of 6-3 with 78 strikeouts and an earned run average of 0.84.  He was inducted into the Kermit Blosser Ohio Athletics Hall of Fame in 1989.

Detroit Tigers
In January 1975, Tobik was drafted by the Detroit Tigers in the first round (second overall) during the secondary phase of the January 1975 MLB draft.

From 1975 to 1977, he played for the Tigers' farm teams in Lakeland, Florida (the Lakeland Flying Tigers) and Montgomery, Alabama (the Montgomery Rebels). He moved up to the Triple-A Evansville Triplets in 1977 and played in Evansville for parts of the 1977 to 1980 seasons.

Tobik made his MLB debut on August 26, 1978, giving up three earned runs in a 9-5 loss to the Milwaukee Brewers.  The following year, he appeared in 37 games for the 1979 Detroit Tigers.  He spent most of the 1980 season in Evansville, but did appear in 17 games (all but one in relief) for the 1980 Tigers.  On August 22, 1980, Tobik struck out four batters in one inning while pitching for Evansville against Denver, as La Rue Washington reached first base on a passed ball after being struck out by Tobik.

In 1981, Tobik compiled a record of 2-2 with a 2.69 earned run average (Adjusted ERA+ of 141) in 60-1/3 innings pitched.

In 1982, and after an injury sidelined Dave Rozema, Tobik became the Tigers' closer.  In June 1982, Sparky Anderson credited Tobik's success to his development of a forkball and called Tobik the "king" of a Detroit bullpen that also included Kevin Saucier and Elías Sosa.  Anderson added: "I admit, I didn't see it coming.  But I'm smart enough to pounce on something good when I see it.  We don't have anybody throwing like Tobik.  That forkball of his is unreal."  In May 1982, Tobik and Jack Morris combined for a two-hit shutout against the California Angels.  In June 1982, Wade Boggs hit his first career home run off Tobik—an 11th inning walk-off home run that Boggs later recalled as a turning point in his early career.  Tobik led the 1982 Tigers with nine saves, and appeared in a career-high 51 games, but also compiled a disappointing record of 4-9.

Texas Rangers
During spring training in 1983, Tobik was traded to the Texas Rangers for all-star outfielder Johnny Grubb.    Playing for the Rangers in 1983, Tobik converted all nine of his save opportunities for the Rangers.  Tobik pitched two seasons for the Rangers, appearing in 51 games, all in relief.  In July 1984, the Rangers sent Tobik to Oklahoma City.  On being sent to Oklahoma City, Tobik told reporters, "I don't know what to think anymore.  I don't think they have to have a reason all the time for doing things.  I'm a major league pitcher.  I don't deserve this but what can you do?"

Calgary and Seattle
In January 1985, Tobik signed with the Calgary Cannons in the Pacific Coast League.  He was the first player to sign with the newly formed Calgary baseball team.  He won a career-high 12 games for the Cannons in 1985 and also established the team record for wins in a season.  Tobik also compiled a 1-0 record for the Seattle Mariners in 1985.  He appeared in his final game for the Mariners on October 5, 1985.  At the end of the 1985 season, the Mariners asked for unconditional waivers on Tobik.

For his career, Tobik had a 14-23 record in 196 games.  He had 28 saves and 116 games finished.  His career ERA was 3.70 (Adjusted ERA+ 110).

Family
Tobik married Anne Harter, whom he met while he played for the Evansville Triplets and she was a sports writer for the Evansville Press. They have two daughters and a son. Their son, Dan Tobik, was a top baseball recruit for the University of Tennessee at Martin. Dan currently pitches in the Los Angeles Angels organization, was drafted in 2013 out of the University of Tennessee at Martin. Tobik today lives in a suburb of St. Louis, Missouri.

References

External links

Venezuelan Professional Baseball League

1953 births
Living people
American expatriate baseball players in Canada
Baseball players from Ohio
Calgary Cannons players
Detroit Tigers players
Evansville Triplets players
Lakeland Tigers players
Leones del Caracas players
American expatriate baseball players in Venezuela
People from Euclid, Ohio
Major League Baseball pitchers
Montgomery Rebels players
Ohio Bobcats baseball players
Oklahoma City 89ers players
Seattle Mariners players
Sportspeople from Cuyahoga County, Ohio
Texas Rangers players